Katy Duhigg is an American attorney and politician serving as a member of the New Mexico Senate from the 10th district. Elected in 2020, Duhigg defeated incumbent Republican Candace Gould. She assumed office on January 19, 2021.

Early life and education 
Born and raised in Albuquerque, New Mexico, Duhigg earned a Bachelor of Arts degree from the University of Oregon and a Juris Doctor from the University of New Mexico School of Law. Duhigg's brother, Charles Duhigg, is a Pulitzer-prize winning journalist and non-fiction author.

Career 
Prior to her election, Duhigg worked as a legal analyst for the New Mexico House of Representatives Judiciary Committee. She is also a founding partner of the Duhigg Law Firm. Duhigg also worked as the state vice-chair of Common Cause New Mexico and was appointed to serve as Albuquerque City Clerk in August 2018. She stepped down as clerk in December 2019 to launch her run for the New Mexico Senate.

In the general election, Duhigg defeated incumbent Republican Candace Gould. She assumed office on January 19, 2020.

References 

Living people
University of Oregon alumni
University of New Mexico School of Law alumni
21st-century American politicians
21st-century American women politicians
Politicians from Albuquerque, New Mexico
Women state legislators in New Mexico
Democratic Party New Mexico state senators
Year of birth missing (living people)